The grammatical particles ( joshi) used in the Kagoshima dialects of Japanese have many features in common with those of other dialects spoken in Kyūshū, with some being unique to the Kagoshima dialects. Like standard Japanese particles, they act as suffixes, adpositions or words immediately following the noun, verb, adjective or phrase that they modify, and are used to indicate the relationship between the various elements of a sentence.

Unlike central Japanese dialects, particles in the Kagoshima dialects are bound clitics, as they have the effect of resyllabifying the last word they attach to.

Resyllabification has also led to the reanalysis of some particles in a few dialects. For instance, the topic particle (w)a has been completely superseded by the form na in Izumi, which in most mainland dialects is merely a variant of (w)a after a moraic nasal.

Resyllabification rules 

When a word is followed by a particle that starts with a vowel (such as the topic particle  a, the accusative particle  o or the dative particle  i), the final syllable of that word will be fused with the particle and be subject to Kagoshima's vowel coalescence rules as well as other sound changes occurring in the regional dialect. As a simple example, when the word   kore "this" is followed by the topic particle  , it becomes   korya "this=". A secondary sound change in Mainland Kagoshima then causes the medial  ry to become  y, giving the common form   koya "this=".

Two main exceptions to this rule exist:

 If a word's underlying form ends in a moraic nasal (i.e. ), an epenthetic  is inserted between the word and the particle. For example,   hon "book" becomes   honna when fused with the topic particle.
 If a word's underlying form ends in a long vowel or sequence of vowels, then an epenthetic consonant is sometimes inserted between the word and the particle. This rule is not consistently applied across all dialects of Kagoshima.

The following table shows how particles change the final syllable of words in the mainland Kagoshima dialects.

The rules of resyllabification differ only slightly in peripheral areas. The following table shows how particles change the final syllable of words in the Sato dialect of the Koshikijima Islands.

 Note: The accusative particle ( o) is not listed above because the Sato dialect replaced it with the particle  ba. For example, the accusative form of koi "this" is simply koi ba.

And the following table shows how particles change the final syllable of words in the Tanegashima dialects.

 Note: Blank entries indicate that examples could not be found or inferred from the source.

Historical attestation 

The phenomenon of resyllabification (or particle fusion) is first attested for the Kagoshima dialect in the 18th-century works of Gonza, a Japanese castaway from Satsuma who was taken to Saint Petersburg, Russia around 1733-1734. Under the supervision of assistant librarian Andrei Bogdanov, Gonza helped produce several reference works on the Japanese language in Russian, including an introductory, a grammar and a dictionary. These works provide the oldest glimpse into the Kagoshima dialect.

For the most part, the works of Gonza show that the topic particle  a and the dative particle  i followed the same rules as they do today, fusing with the final syllable of the preceding word and being subject to the same exceptions that exist today. The accusative particle  wo, however, was independent and shows fusion in only a couple recorded examples.

Comparison with Amami and standard Japanese 

The following table gives an overview of some of the main particles used in Kagoshima as compared to those used in Northern Amami, a language group spoken directly to the south of the Kagoshima dialects, as well as standard Japanese.

1. These forms are not attested in the referenced source, but are inferred based on the Kagoshima City forms and known sound changes in Minamikyūshū.

Overall, Kagoshima and Amami varieties appear more similar to each other when it comes to the overlapping use of the genitive and nominative particles, the use of a topicalized accusative particle (absent in standard Japanese), the use of a purposive particle that is separate from the dative particle, and the use of multiple terminative particles. When it comes to dative, locative, directional and instrumental particles, Kagoshima is more similar to standard Japanese than it is to Amami, as Amami varieties use a number of different particles for these cases. Kagoshima also uses a regular accusative particle like standard Japanese, whereas most Amami varieties do not.

Index of particles

A-Z index 

 bakkai
 batten
 chi
 de (1)
 de (2)
 do
 don
 doma
 ga
 gaa
 gii
 hozu
 i
 ina
 ka (1)
 ka (2)
 kara
 ke (1)
 ke (2)
 mo / n
 mon
 mon ka
 na
 na(n)do
 naa / nee / nii
 no
 o
 (o)ba
 see
 seka
 shiko
 to (1)
 to (2)
 to (3)
 (w)a
 (w)ai / (w)a / i
 yara
 yokka
 yoo
 zui

Index by meaning 

 also
 and / with
 as if
 at / in / to
 because
 but
 emphatic markers
 even
 for example
 from
 just
 more than
 of / 's
 object markers
 question markers
 quote markers
 only
 or
 roughly
 tag markers ("eh?", "right?")
 topic marker ("as for")
 to the extent of
 towards
 until / up to
 with / using

Syntactic case-marking particles 

Case-marking particles are short lexical items that attach to the end of nouns, verbs or adjectives and help indicate their grammatical relation within a phrase, clause or sentence.

To illustrate, the following example shows how the word "cat" is explicitly marked to indicate that it is the subject of the transitive verb, while the word "fish" is marked to indicate that it is the object of the verb within the phrase "The cat ate the fish".

Note that most case-marking particles do not have a direct translation in English, as modern English mostly relies on word order, although it does have some basic subject (aka nominative) and object (aka accusative) marking in personal pronouns such as "he" versus "him".

Ablative

kara 
Like standard Japanese, the particle  kara is used to indicate a time or place from which something begins. In this sense, it can generally be translated to "from" in English. Regional variants of this particle include  kaa and  ka. In the Higashimorokata district of Miyazaki specifically, the form  kai is used.

Unlike standard Japanese, this particle is not used to mark a reason. Instead, the Kagoshima particle  de is used for that purpose. For example, in the standard Japanese sentence  machi kara totte kuru mono desu kara "because it was bought from town", the first instance where  kara is used to mean "from" remains unchanged in Kagoshima, while the second, where it's used to mean "because", is replaced by the particle  de:

In a few Kagoshima dialects, the particle  kara can be used in two additional ways that are different from standard Japanese.

(1) In the first, it can be used to indicate the means used to arrive to a situation (such as the means of transportation), overlapping with the standard particle  de "by" in this sense. For example:

The particle  kara does not replace the other usages of  de "by". For instance, it cannot be used to mark the tool used to achieve an action. So in the sentence "to write with a brush",  de would be used.

(2) In the second, it can be used to mark the agent in an adversative-passive sentence, replacing the standard particle  ni. For example:

It is worth noting that both usages of  kara in (1) and (2) above may have once been more widespread in Japan, as they were historically attested in Diego Collado's Ars Grammaticae Iaponicae Linguae (Grammar of the Japanese language), published in 1632. Examples of the first taken from his work include  "(he) came by ship" and  "(he) came on foot" (spellings modernized). An example of the second would be  "(he) was killed by Pedro".

Accusative

o (1) 
The particle  o is a case particle that marks the direct object in a sentence. Depending on the word that precedes, it can also be pronounced  u.

Like the particles  a and  i, when  o is added to a word, the final syllable of that word will be subject to resyllabification. For instance,  koi "this" becomes  koyo "this=".

Example:

oba and ba 
The particle  oba or  ba marks a topicalized direct object. This form historically derives from a contraction of the accusative marker wo and the topic particle ɸa (modern day wa ~ a). In several Western Kyūshū dialects, ba has completely replaced the particle o as the accusative marker. However, the use of the particle ba within the Kagoshima dialects is restricted mainly to the Koshikijima Islands and is not as widespread elsewhere. Considered an archaism in Standard Japanese, the form oba, pronounced uba in Southern Kagoshima, is more frequently used instead. In contrast with the particle o, oba can be described as an emphatic accusative; that is, it places more emphasis on the direct object.

Examples:

Comparative

yokka 
The particle  yokka or its variant  yoka is used in place of standard Japanese  yori and, like it, it has two main functions. The first is that it can be used to indicate the origin of something, akin to "from" or "beginning from" in English. The second is that it can be used to make comparisons, roughly translating to "more than" or "rather than". In southern Koshikijima and northern Tanegashima, the variant  yoika is used, while in northern Koshikijima, the forms  yokyaa and  yuukyaa are observed. Etymologically, the particle is considered a contraction of  yori and  ka.

Dative and locative

i 
The dative-locative particle  i (and its variant  ni) can be used to mark a location, a direction, a time, a state, a goal, the recipient of an action, or the agent in a passive sentence. Its usage is very similar to those of the particles  ni "in/at/to" and  e "to/towards" in standard Japanese. In English, this particle can variously be translated by the prepositions "to", "in", "at", "into", "towards", "by" or "with" depending on the sentence.

Like the particles  a and  o, when  i is added to a word, the final syllable of that word will be subject to resyllabification.

Example of its use to mark a location or direction:

Example of its use to mark the recipient of an action:

Example of its use to mark a state:

ina 
The particle  ina (or  inyaa in northern Koshikijima) generally means "for", "in", "to" or "in order to". Etymologically, it is a combination of the particles  i and  a and is cognate with the standard Japanese construction  ni wa.

Genitive and nominative 
In Old Japanese, the particles  ga and  no had overlapping functions as genitive and nominative markers, and were ultimately distinguished by their degree of politeness. The Kagoshima dialects, like other Western Kyūshū dialects and Ryukyuan varieties, are notable in that this original distinction is largely maintained, although some regional variation in usage occurs.

ga 
In Kagoshima, the particle  ga is considered somewhat more derogatory and occurs mainly with a human subject or possessor.

Examples:

no 
In contrast with the particle  ga, the particle  no (or  n) is considered more neutral or polite.

The particle  no is sometimes reduced to  n.

Instrumental

de 
The instrumental particle  de is used to mark the means or tool used to accomplish an action. It can typically be translated to "with", "by" or "using" in English.

From an etymological standpoint, this particle is cognate to the standard Japanese particle  de, broadly meaning "with", "at" or "by". However, it does differ from its standard counterpart in two main ways:

 When indicating the means used to arrive at a situation (similar to the English word "by" in the sentence "he travelled by boat"), most Kagoshima dialects favour the ablative particle  kara instead of  de.
 When marking the location of an action, most Kagoshima dialects favour either the lative particle  see "in, at, to" or the dative-locative particle  i "in, at, to, by" instead of  de.

Lative

see 
The particle  see and its many regional variations (e.g.  se,  sai,  sae,  san,  sane,  same,  samee,  samyaa) marks direction. It can roughly be translated as "in" or "to" in English and is comparable in usage to  e in standard Japanese. Etymologically, the particle is said to originate from the expression  sama ni "by way of, in the state of".

Nominalizing

to 
Other than its standard usages, the particle  is also a nominalizing particle in the Kagoshima dialects. That is, it can be appended to a verb, an adjective or another utterance to transform it into a noun. This usage is similar to how  no is used in standard Japanese.

The particle  can also be used at the end of declarative sentences to add mild emphasis.

ta 
The particle  ta or its variant  taa is a combination of the nominalizing particle  to and the topic particle  a. It can be combined with a verb or adjective to turn it into a noun, similar to how  mono wa and  no wa work in standard Japanese.

Purposive

ke (2) 
The particle  ke can be used with verbs in their stem form to indicate either the purpose of a movement or the arrival point of a movement. It most often occurs in the construction  ~ ke iʔ "to go (do something)". In parts of the Koshikijima islands, the variant  kyaa is used; in Tanegashima, the variant  kaa is used; in parts of the Tokara islands,  geera is used; in southern Satsuma, the variant  ge is used; and amongst older people in the Higashimorokata district of Miyazaki, the variant  ge is observed. In the nearby Kikai language spoken to the south of Kagoshima, three similar particles are reported:  kai,  gachi or  kachi, and  kani.

Note that this particle can only be used with verbs. With nouns, the particle  i is used instead. For example:

Quotative

to (3) 
The quotative particle  to is used to mark speech or thought that is being directly quoted (e.g. something someone else said) or indirectly quoted (e.g. paraphrasing what someone else said or indicating hearsay). While both this particle and the particle  chi largely overlap in usage, the particle  to tends to be favoured with verbs of thought such as  omoʔ "to think".

chi 
The quotative particle  chi is used to mark speech or thought that is being directly quoted (e.g. something someone else said) or indirectly quoted (e.g. paraphrasing what someone else said or indicating hearsay). While both this particle and the particle  to largely overlap in usage, the particle  chi tends to be favoured with verbs of speech or communication such as  yu "to say" or  kiʔ "to hear".

When followed by the verb  yu "to say", it tends to fuse, becoming  chuu or  chu instead.

Binding particles

Topic

(w)a 
The particle  a or wa is a topic marker. That is, it marks the main thing being talked about in a sentence. Like the particles  o and  i, when  a is added to a word, the final syllable of that word will be subject to resyllabification. For instance,  koi "this" becomes  koya "this=" when topicalized.

Conjunctive particles 

Conjunctive particles are a category of particles that connect words, phrases or clauses together.

Concessive

batten ("but") 
The particle  batten is a conjunctive particle meaning "but" or "although". It is less commonly used than  don. In the peripheral islands of Tanegashima, Yakushima and Tokara, the variants  batte and  batche are also used alongside  batten.

don ("but") 
The particle  don is a conjunctive particle meaning "but" or "although" and typically follows a declarative verb.

From an etymological standpoint, while the particle  don is technically cognate with the standard Japanese particle  domo "even though", it may be more accurate to say that it stems from a reduction of the standard expression  keredomo "but" which carries the same meaning. This is supported by the fact that, in neighboring provinces such as Miyazaki (including the Higashimorokata district), the form  kendon is used, which can be further shortened to  ken (as opposed to  don like in Kagoshima).

Consequential

de ("because") 
The particle  de (sometimes  dee in northern Koshikijima) can be combined with verbs or adjectives to mean "because". It is used in place of the standard Japanese particles  kara or  node.

Coordinating 

Coordinating particles (sometimes called connective particles or parallel markers) are particles used to link more than one noun or nominalized phrase together. They generally cover the meanings of "and" and "or".

to ("and, with") 
The conjunctive or comitative particle  to generally serves to coordinate nouns or noun phrases and can be translated to "and",  "with" or "together with" in English. This particle is the same in both pronunciation and usage as standard Japanese.

Note that verbs and adjectives are coordinated using verbal suffixes instead of this particle. See Kagoshima verb conjugations: Te form for details.

yara ("and") 
The conjunctive particle  yara is used to coordinate nouns and signal that the list is incomplete. In this sense, it can translated to "A, B and C (amongst other things)" or "A, B, C, etc.". The particle is equivalent in usage to the standard Japanese particle  ya.

ka ("or") 
The disjunctive particle  ka serves to coordinate nouns or noun phrases and can be translated to "or" in English. This particle is the same in both pronunciation and usage as standard Japanese.

Adverbial particles 

Adverbial particles are a broad category of particles that attach to the end of nouns or phrases (such as noun phrases and verb phrases) and "express such meanings as restriction, exemplification or similarity", amongst others.

Approximation

doma ("roughly") 
The particle  doma typically follows nouns and marks approximation. It can be translated as "roughly", "approximately" , "just about", "around" or "or so" in English. The closest standard Japanese equivalents would be  bakari wa,  gurai wa and  nado wa.

Etymologically,  doma stems from the word  tomo, meaning "together with" in standard Japanese, and the topic particle は (w)a.

Exemplification

nando or nado ("for example") 
The particle of exemplification  nando and its variant  nado roughly translates to "for example" or "such as" in English.

Focus

mo or n ("also") 
The focus particle  mo and its variant  n marks inclusion or similarity and roughly translates to "also", "too" or "as well" in English.

seka ("even") 
The focus particle  seka (or  saaka in northern Koshikijima) expresses an extreme example and roughly translates to "even", "(if) only" or "as long as" in English. The particle is usually followed by a verb in the conditional form. From a usage perspective, this particle is equivalent to the standard Japanese particle  sae "even", to which it is related.

Example from Koshikijima:

Restriction

bakkai ("just") 
The restrictive particle  bakkai, roughly translating to "just", is functionally the same as standard Japanese  bakari (colloquially  bakkari).

hozu ("to the extent of") 
The restrictive particle  hozu is used to show the extent to which the following verb or adjective applies to what precedes. In English, it can be roughly translated with the expressions "to the extent of", "as (much) as" or "so (...) that". This particle is cognate with the standard Japanese particle  hodo and is largely limited to the Higashimorokata district of Miyazaki. In Kagoshima, the particle  shiko is used instead.

shiko ("to the extent of") 
The restrictive particle  shiko (sometimes pronounced  hiko) is used to show the extent to which the following verb or adjective applies to what precedes. In English, it can be roughly translated with the expressions "to the extent of", "as (much) as" or "so (...) that". The particle  shiko is used in place of standard Japanese  dake or  hodo. Etymologically,  shiko may be related to standard Japanese  shiki, found in compounds like  koreshiki "only this much", as well as  shika "only", which is limited in standard Japanese to negative phrases.

Terminative (or limitative)

gii ("until, up to") 
The terminative particle  gii or its variant  gi is used to indicate a time or place as a limit and can be translated as "until" or "up to" in English. It is functionally similar to the particle  made in Japanese.

Etymologically, the particle originated from the noun  kiri meaning "end" or "bound" (rendaku form:  giri), possibly by way of shortening the term  kagiri "limit, as far as, as much as". The noun  kiri also gave way to the standard Japanese particle  kiri ( giri), meaning "just" or "only". To the south of Kagoshima, similar terminative particles are attested in Northern Ryukyuan varieties, such as  gari in Kikai and  gadi in Okinoerabu. However, it is unclear if these are related.

made ("until, up to") 
Just like in standard Japanese, the terminative particle  made is used to indicate a time or place as a limit and can be translated as "until" or "up to" in English. In the Nakatane dialect of Tanegashima, the form  maje is used, while in the Taira dialect of Koshijijima, the form  myaa is used.

zui ("until, up to") 
The terminative particle  zui (also spelled  dzui) is used to indicate a time or place as a limit and can be translated as "to", "until" or "up to" in English. It is functionally equivalent to the particle  made "to, up to, until", used in both standard Japanese and the local Kagoshima dialects. In the Higashimorokata district of Miyazaki, the form  zuri is used, while in the town of Ei, Kagoshima (now Minamikyūshū), the form  djui is used.

Etymologically, the particle  zui likely originates from the noun  "setting out (to)", which was historically pronounced dzuri in Kagoshima and would be cognate with the form  de "coming out" in modern standard Japanese. This is evidenced by the fact that the verb  "to go out; to exit; to set out" and its nominal form are still pronounced ずい zui or dzui in the traditional Kagoshima dialects.

In Koshikijima,  zui can also be used in the sense of "even" or "so far as":

Sentence-final particles 

Sentence-final particles, sometimes called sentence-ending particles or interactional particles, are uninflected lexical items that appear at the end of a phrase or sentence. Unlike other types of particles such as case particles or conjunctive particles, sentence-final particles do not indicate the grammatical relation of different elements in a clause. Instead, they can be described as indicating "the illocutionary force of the proposition as well as the speaker's attitude towards the proposition and/or the interloculor(s)". This means that, among other things, sentence-final particles can be used to indicate how true the speaker believes the utterance is (e.g. definitely true, probably true, hearsay, personal opinion, etc.), to express the speaker's personal feelings towards the utterance (e.g. admiration, shock, etc.), or to solicit a reaction from the listener. They can also vary based on the speaker's relation with the listener and the degree of politeness they wish to express.

Modality markers

(w)ai, (w)a and i 
The particle  ai or more rarely  wai is a sentence-final particle used to bring awareness to something and to indicate that the speaker is expressing their own view. Unlike other sentence-final particles, this particle attaches to the preceding word (typically a verb in its non-past form) and fuses with the vowel of the final syllable of that word. Functionally, this particle is similar in usage to the particle  yo in standard Japanese. In the Koshikijima islands, the variants  a and  wa are used.

Etymologically, the particle is said to originate from the historical pronoun  ware "I" and to be cognate with the sentence-ending particles  wa,  wai and  bai used dialectally throughout Japan.

After a verb in its volitional form (also called the presumptive form), the particle is reduced to  i and serves to add insistence to what is being said. Examples from Izumi, Kagoshima include  nomoi "let's drink",  ikoi "let's go",  miroi "let's see" and  shui "let's do (it)".

do 
The sentence-final particle  do, sometimes lengthened to  doo, is used mark an assertion and to grab the attention of the addressee, if one is present. It is functionally similar to the particles  yo and  zo in standard Japanese as well as the particle  doo used in most Ryukyuan languages such as Okinawan.

Note that when this particle follows the polite auxiliary verb  monsu, the final -su gets dropped. For example,  iʔ-mon do "(I'm) going!" (instead of *iʔ-monsu do).

gaa 

The sentence-final particle  gaa or sometimes just  ga is used to mark a statement that the speaker believes to be true. In English, it can be overtly translated as "I believe (that)" or "I think (that)", whereas in standard Japanese, there is no direct equivalent to this particle, so it is often translated with the tag-marker  ne "eh?" or "right?", with the declarative modal particle  yo or with the modal auxiliary of probability  darou.

mon 
As a regular noun,  mon means "thing" and often follows verbs in their nominal form or stem form to create a compound noun. For example,  kuimon "food" is a compound of  kui "eating" and  mon "thing".

This word can also be used at the end of a sentence, where it functionally acts like both a nominalizer and a sentence-final particle marking a cheeky comment, sometimes translated as "you know" in English. When used as such, it is always written in kana as  mon. In regards to its usage, the particle  mon typically follows adjectives and verbs directly and is often also followed by the copula  ja "is".

mon ka 
The compound particle  mon ka (pronounced  mun ka in the southern Satsuma Peninsula) typically follows a declarative verb and serves to both nominalize the phrase and to repudiate or dismiss the idea brought forth. In this sense, it can be overtly translated as "as if (I would)" or "there's no way (I could)". It can also simply be translated in English with negation, e.g. "(I) will not".

Functionally, this compound particle is the same as standard Japanese  mon ka, and ultimately derives from a combination of the sentence-final particle  mon and the question particle  ka.

naa, nee and nii 
The sentence-final particles  na(a),  ne(e) and   nii (used chiefly in Minamikyūshū) are used to indicate or solicit acknowledgement, agreement or confirmation regarding non-controversial information. In English, these particles are typically translated using tag question markers such as "eh?", "right?", "isn't it?" or "aren't you?" because of their use in utterances where the speaker is looking for agreement or confirmation from the listener. That said, they also play a role in narration where they help indicate that the statement uttered is incomplete and is the basis for what will be said next, and that the speaker may or may not be seeking acknowledgement from the listener (through backchannel responses).

Etymologically, these particles are all cognate with the standard Japanese particle  ne and its variant  na, common in most Western Japanese dialects.

A study on sentence-final particles in the Sato dialect of Koshikijima found that, while  na(a) and  ne(e) mostly overlapped in usage, speakers felt that the particle ne(e) was not native to their dialect and was instead an artifact of standard Japanese. The same study confirmed that the usage of ne(e) was very similar to that of the particle ne in standard Japanese and that some minor differences with the native particle na(a) existed. One such difference is that ne(e) tends to only be used when speakers mix in standard Japanese grammar. Another is that it is not used when talking to oneself (e.g. it would not be used when thinking to oneself "*that flower is so pretty"), whereas the native particle na(a) can be.

o 
The particle  o or  oo (sometimes written  and  respectively) is a sentence-final particle used to stress the utterance. It tends to follow declarative or imperative statements and is similar in usage to the particles  yo and  wa in standard Japanese.

Etymologically, it is likely that this particle is a holdover from Old and Middle Japanese and that it has the same origins as the accusative case particle  o, which is used to mark the direct object in a sentence. In Old Japanese, the particle  started as an exclamatory particle expressing consent and response and was sometimes used in sentence-final position as an interjectional particle used to mark admiration in a declarative phrase or to add strength to an imperative phrase.

In Tanegashima, this particle fuses with the preceding word. For example, the phrase  yoka o "it's good" would become  yokoo.

yoo 
The sentence-final particle  yoo or sometimes just  yo is used mark an assertion and to grab the attention of the addressee, if one is present. Etymologically, it is cognate with the standard Japanese particle  yo.

A study on sentence-final particles in the Sato dialect of Koshikijima found that, while  yo(o) and  do(o) mostly overlapped in usage, speakers felt that the particle yo(o) was not native to their dialect and was instead an artifact of standard Japanese. The study, however, was not able to validate this claim as speakers did not tend to mix in standard Japanese grammar when the particle was used (unlike the particle  ne(e)). The study only found one salient difference between the two particles which was that speakers did not use yo(o) when speaking or thinking to themselves, preferring do(o) instead.

Question markers

ka 
Like standard Japanese, the sentence-final particle  ka (pronounced  ga in Makurazaki city) is used to mark a question at the end of a phrase. Compared to the question particles  ke and  na, the particle  ka is neutral and can be used with anyone regardless of age.

ke (1) 
The sentence-final particle  ke or sometimes  kee (pronounced  ge and  gee in Makurazaki city) is used to mark a question at the end of a phrase. While this particle is functionally equivalent to the question particle  ka, it is more specifically used when talking to someone who is younger.

na 
The sentence-final particle  na is used to mark a question at the end of a phrase. While this particle is functionally equivalent to the question particle  ka, it is more specifically used when talking to someone who is older.

See also 

Particles used in other Japonic varieties:
 Particles in Early Middle Japanese
 Particles in standard Japanese  (see also: full list of particles)
 Particles in Kansai dialects
 Particles in Hachijō
 Particles in Okinawan

Particles used in other languages of East Asia:
 Particles in Chinese
 Particles in Korean
 Particles in Jeju
 Particles in Manchu

References 

Japanese dialects
Kagoshima Prefecture